Sardinian surnames are surnames with origins from the Sardinian language or a long, identifiable tradition on the Western Mediterranean island of Sardinia.

History

Oldest records

In Roman epigraphs from Sardinia, onomastics sometimes appear that would later come back in medieval and/or modern times. We mention for example:  (CIL, X, 7876) that reverberates in the medieval  /  /  /  / ;  (CIL, X, 7877), related to the surname  / ;  /  and the medieval  / ;  to today's surname ;  to the medieval  and today's .

Medieval and Early modern records

, today ). 

Surnames were frequently inherited from the maternal side, from the Middle Ages up to contemporary times.

Etymology
Current Sardinian surnames originated in the late Middle Ages. Most of the Sardinian-specific surnames derive from the Sardinian language, denoting toponyms (e.g. "pig",  "magpie",  "puppy dog" etc.), plant names (e.g. "melon",  "flower"), color names (e.g. "white",  "black"), nicknames (e.g. "Sebastian"), sometimes indicative of a personal trait (e.g. "big") or of a filial relationship (e.g. , "son/daughter of Mr. "), and to a lesser extent anthroponyms (e.g. ,  "Marc" etc.) or trade names (e.g. "blacksmith"); some of them derive from forms related to the Paleo-Sardinian substratum and sometimes already attested as onomastic forms in Sardinian epigraphs from the Roman period.

Among the Sardinian-language surnames which trace their roots outside the island, the most relevant percentage (7% of the total) is constituted by surnames from Corsica (France), or those indicating a possible Corsican origin (e.g. A considerable migratory flow coming from the other side of the Strait of Bonifacio occurred, in fact, since the Middle Ages and ended only in the first decades of the 19th century.

Relatively common are also surnames originating from the Italian peninsula or indicating a possible Italian origin (e.g. , ancient  e.g. , meaning from Massa, the Sardinian-language  or the Italian equivalent , meaning from Pisa,  from Perugia), some of which are documented starting from the Judicates' period, and especially Ligurian and Tuscan surnames due to the political relations and trade between Sardinia and the two maritime republics of Genoa and Pisa; among the most influential in Sardinian history, the Lacon-Massa (Obertenghi), the Doria, the Visconti etc.

Quite significant is also the number of Iberian surnames, or surnames originating from the Iberian peninsula and specifically from the region of Catalonia (e.g.

Frequency
The following surnames are the twenty most widespread ones in Sardinia: overall, 10 of them are required to identify 10% of the Sardinian population, and less than 100 for one third of all the island's residents.
Sanna
Piras
Pinna
Serra
Melis
Carta
Manca
Meloni
Mura
Lai
Murgia
Porcu
Cossu
Usai
Loi
Marras
Floris
Deiana
Cocco
Fadda

Most widespread Sardinian surnames by Province

See also
Sardinia
Sardinians
Sardinian language

References

Bibliography

Robert J. Rowland, Onomastic Remarks on Roman Sardinia, Names  21:2, 1973, 82-102
Heinz Jürgen Wolf, Sardische Herkunftsnamen, in: Beiträge zur Namensforschung, 1988, v. 23 (1-2), S. 1-67

.

Sardinia
Sardinian culture
Sardinian language
Surnames by culture